Most Shocking is an American reality television series that originally aired on Court TV and later its successor truTV. The series premiered on October 4, 2006 and ended on November 10, 2010, with a total of 88 episodes over the course of 7 seasons.

Series overview

Episodes

Season 1 (2006)

Season 2 (2007)

Season 3 (2007–08)

Season 4 (2008)

Season 5 (2008)

Season 6 (2008–09)

Season 7 (2009–2010)

References

External links

Official website
truTV's "Most Shocking" Site, with Video Clips
List of Most Shocking episodes

Lists of American non-fiction television series episodes